Womanist Party of India (also called Bharatiya Streevadi Paksh), is a political party in India. Its core issue is the emancipation of women. The WPI was founded in Mumbai on October 31, 2003. The WPI president is Varsha Kale. And the General Secretary is Avisha Kulkarni.

The party decided to call itself 'womanist' as they consider the word 'feminist' to carry an upper-class connotation in India.

References

External links 
 Article on WPI
 Another article

Political parties in Maharashtra
Feminist parties in Asia
Womanism
Women's organisations based in India
Feminist organisations in India
2003 establishments in Maharashtra
Political parties established in 2003